Shivraj Singh Lodhi (born 8 October 1943 Banda Belai, Sagar district) is an Indian politician, belonging to the Bhartiya Janata Party. In the 2009 election he was elected to the 15th Lok Sabha from the Damoh Lok Sabha constituency of Madhya Pradesh.

He was a member of the Madhya Pradesh Legislative Assembly for two terms during 1977-1980 and 1984–1989.

He is an agriculturist and resides in Sagar district.

He is married to Smt Ahilya Bai, with whom he has four sons and three daughters.

References

External links
 Fifteenth Lok Sabha Members Bioprofile in Lok Sahba website

India MPs 2009–2014
1943 births
Living people
People from Madhya Pradesh
People from Damoh
Bharatiya Janata Party politicians from Madhya Pradesh
Madhya Pradesh MLAs 1977–1980
Lok Sabha members from Madhya Pradesh
People from Sagar district